The 2019 Ford EcoBoost 400 was a Monster Energy NASCAR Cup Series race that was held on November 17, 2019, at Homestead-Miami Speedway in Homestead, Florida. Contested over 267 laps on the 1.5 mile (2.4 km) oval, it was the 36th and final race of the 2019 Monster Energy NASCAR Cup Series season.

Report

Background

Homestead-Miami Speedway is a motor racing track located in Homestead, Florida. The track, which has several configurations, has promoted several series of racing, including NASCAR, the Verizon IndyCar Series, the Grand-Am Rolex Sports Car Series and the Championship Cup Series.

Since 2002, Homestead-Miami Speedway has hosted the final race of the season in all three of NASCAR's series: the Sprint Cup Series, Xfinity Series and Gander Outdoors Truck Series. Ford Motor Company sponsors all three of the season-ending races; the races have the names Ford EcoBoost 400, Ford EcoBoost 300 and Ford EcoBoost 200, respectively, and the weekend is marketed as Ford Championship Weekend. The Xfinity Series (then known as the Busch Series) has held its season-ending races at Homestead since 1995.

Championship drivers
Martin Truex Jr. was the first of the four drivers to clinch a spot in the Championship 4, winning the first race of the Round of 8 at Martinsville.

Kevin Harvick clinched the second spot in the Championship 4, winning the second race of the Round of 8 at Texas.

Denny Hamlin clinched the third spot after winning the final race of the Round of 8 at Phoenix.

Kyle Busch clinched the last spot in the Championship 4 based on points.

Entry list
 (i) denotes driver who are ineligible for series driver points.
 (R) denotes rookie driver.
 (CC) denotes championship contender

Practice

First practice
First practice session scheduled for Friday was cancelled due to rain. Final practice session was postponed to Saturday in place of qualifying also due to rain.

Final practice

Qualifying
Qualifying for Saturday was cancelled due to rain on Friday and Denny Hamlin, the point leader, was awarded the pole as a result.

Starting Lineup

Race
Note: Kyle Busch, Kevin Harvick, Denny Hamlin, and Martin Truex Jr. are not eligible for stage points because of their participation in the Championship 4.

Stage results

Stage One
Laps: 80

Stage Two
Laps: 80

Final stage results

Stage Three
Laps: 107

NOTE:  On November 27, 2019, NASCAR revised the official race results and penalised four teams -- 15, 27, 52, and 77 -- with 50 point penalties for teams.  As all but one of the drivers was ineligible for points, NASCAR assessed the 50 point penalties for teams (as listed), and no drivers were penalised.  The four teams were charged with race manipulation.  According to NASCAR officials, the match fixing was deliberately aimed to allow the Premium Motorsports No. 27 team to claim the most owner points of all teams not holding a charter, surpassing the Gaunt Brothers Racing No. 96 team in points, which is worth $175,000 more to the team in question.  In the scheme, the 15, 77, and 52 teams all pulled their cars off the track early so the 27 can pass the 96 team in points.

Race statistics
 Lead changes: 14 among 5 different drivers
 Cautions/Laps: 3 for 15
 Red flags: 0
 Time of race: 2 hours, 48 minutes and 47 seconds
 Average speed:

Race manipulation

A race manipulation scheme late in the race was uncovered by NASCAR officials involving four teams (three chartered, one open) with end-of-season points and financial bonus payments.  This was announced on November 27, 2019 by NASCAR's Scott Miller, who explained after reviewing data during the race, including radio communications among drivers and teams, including interviewing various competitors, that they had uncovered a deliberate race manipulation scheme to help teams with financial bonuses.

The Premium Motorsports No. 27 team was competing with the Gaunt Brothers Racing No. 96 team to be the highest placed non-charter team, enabling them a higher end of season cash bonus for the teams. Heading into the race the 27 car was 7 points ahead of the 96 car heading into the race According to the official NASCAR statement, they had found the Spire Motorsports No. 77, Rick Ware Racing No. 52, and Premium Motorsports No. 15 and No. 27 teams deliberately manipulated the finish of the race to allow the No. 27 team (an open team) to score more points than the No. 96 team to claim the Open teams championship, and the financial bonus. Before the race manipulation occurred Chastain was running 38th around 24 laps back and getting close to being passed by Bubba Wallace in the #43 (which did occur) while the 96 car was running in 29th at 5 laps back. if the fix had not occurred the 96 would have defeated the 27 by a tiebreaker based on the best finish between the 2 (with the #96 having a best finish of 15th at the 2019 Daytona 500 and the 2019 1000Bulbs.com 500 and the #27 having a best finish of 18th at the 2019 GEICO 500.) The No. 15, 77, and 52 teams each deliberately parked their cars within a 15-lap span near the end of the race in order to ensure the No. 27 team would score two points instead of one which would have beaten the No. 96 team by one point in the end of season results. Spire Motorsports driver Reed Sorenson was heard ignoring multiple calls to pit on the radio before finally obliging and the team subsequently retired the car for "mechanical issues".

NASCAR fined Scott Egglestone (Premium Motorsports) and Kenneth Evans (Rick Ware Racing) $25,000 each and suspended both indefinitely.  All three team owners were fined $50,000, and all four cars were assessed a fifty-point penalty. The same day, Spire Motorsports released a statement saying they would not appeal their penalties, while Premium and RWR did not comment.

Media

Television
NBC covered the race on the television side. Rick Allen, Jeff Burton, Steve Letarte and Dale Earnhardt Jr. had the call in the booth for the race. Dave Burns, Parker Kligerman, Marty Snider and Kelli Stavast reported from pit lane during the race. While the race itself aired on NBC, NBCSN aired NBCSN NASCAR Hot Pass, a simultaneous live feed dedicated to each of the Championship drivers, with commentary by Leigh Diffey and Dale Jarrett. Also, three different angles from in-car cameras and a track map tracked the driver's position and changes throughout the field. This will be the last time that NBC broadcast the race as this race moves to March and will be broadcast by Fox in 2020.

Radio
MRN had the radio call for the race, which was simulcast on Sirius XM NASCAR Radio. Alex Hayden, Jeff Striegle, and NASCAR Hall of Famer Rusty Wallace called the action of the race for MRN when the field raced down the front straightaway. Dave Moody covered the action for MRN in turns 1 & 2, and Mike Bagley had the call of the action from turns 3 & 4. Winston Kelley, Steve Post, Kim Coon, and Dillon Welch covered the action of the race for MRN on pit road.

Standings after the race

Manufacturers' Championship standings

Note: Only the first 16 positions are included for the driver standings.

References

Ford EcoBoost 400
Ford EcoBoost 400
Ford EcoBoost 400
Controversies in Florida
Match fixing
NASCAR controversies
NASCAR races at Homestead-Miami Speedway
Ford EcoBoost 400
Sports scandals in the United States